Abū al-Ḥasan Muḥammad bin al-Ḥusayn bin Mūsā  (970 – 1015), also known as al-Sharīf al-Raḍī was a Shia scholar and poet.

Al-Radi wrote several books on Islamic issues and interpretation of the Quran. His most well-known book is Nahj al-Balagha.

His elder brother al-Sharif al-Murtada was also a theologian and poet. His work is still published in the universities of Cairo and Beirut, and form part of the course of Arabic literature.

Family tree 
Al-Radi was a descendant of Ibrahim al-Asghar, the son of the seventh Shia imam, Musa al-Kazim. There are also claims that he is the descendant of Ibrahim al-Mujab, the grandson of al-Kazim. His mother was the granddaughter of Hasan al-Utrush, a descendant of the fourth Shia imam, Ali Zayn al-Abidin. For this reason, he was also known as thil hasabayn (the possessor of two lineages), since he relates back to the Ahl al-Bayt paternally and maternally.

Biography 
Al-Radi was born in 970 in the Abbasid capital, Baghdad, and died in 1015 in his hometown. His grave is located in Kadhimiya, Baghdad. Al-Radi was the third of four children, having two sisters and a brother. For a long time, his father, Husayn, occupied the post of naqib of the Talibids of Iraq. After his father's death, he took the post.

Al-Radi's family was affluent, as his mother Fatima inherited a good fortune from her father. She sponsored the family when the property of her husband was confiscated by the Buyid prince 'Adud al-Dawla.

Education and teaching 
After al-Radi completed primary education, his mother took her two sons to al-Shaykh al-Mufid for their education. He started teaching at the young age of 17 when he was himself studying. In addition to al-Mufid, he also studied Arabic under Abu Sa'id al-Hasan ibn 'Abd Allah ibn Marzban al-Sirafi, an expert in Arabic language and literature.  His teacher in fiqh was Muhammad ibn al-Abbas al-Khwarizmi.

He also founded a school named Dar ul'Ilm (literally House of knowledge) in which he trained many students.

Character and literary status 
In al-Radi's lifetime, Abbasid rulers of Baghdad were at war with the Fatimid Caliphate of Egypt, and attempted to have all important Sunni and Shia figures sign a mahzur (public attestation decree) in favour of the legitimacy of war with the Egyptian rulers; al-Radi, his father, and brother were also coerced to sign it, but refused to sign. He devoted twenty years of his life in compiling Nahj al-Balaghah, and traveled to many libraries to collect texts that had recorded the lectures, letters, and sayings that Ali had written or delivered on different occasions.

Works 
The Nahj al-Balagha (Peak of Eloquence) is considered a masterpiece of literature in Shia Islam. The book is a collection of sermons, precepts, prayers, epistles, and aphorisms of Ali and compiled by al-Radi in the tenth century. As the reference material came to his attention at different times, the materials have no chronological sequence with respect to content or topic. A number of his contemporaries wrote commentaries on al-Radi's compilation.

Extent and scope of compilation
Ali's sermons were compiled, read, and taught before al-Radi was born. The services of al-Radi are now regarded as significant in the philosophy of monotheism. 

Collected sermons in the Nahj al-Balagha mainly cover Islam and the Quran; humans and humanity; theology and metaphysics; path and worship, including prayers; social justice and administration; wisdom and admonition; prophecies; philosophy and critique over contemporary society; Ahl al-Bayt; and piety and the afterlife.

However, critics of the Nahj al-Balagha generally raise two objections: they claim that al-Murtada is the actual author, and most of the contents are falsely attributed to Ali.

Offspring and death 
Some historians believe al-Radi died at 47 years of age on the sixth of Muharram, 406 A.H (1015 AD), while others his death at 45 years of age in 404 Hijri (1013 AD).  His funeral prayer was performed by the Abu Ghalib Fukhrul Mulk, then vizier in the kingdom of Sultan al-Dawla.

Abu Ahmad Adnan was the only son of al-Radi. His son was also a prominent scholar of his time and after death of his uncle the official post of Naqib al-Nuqqab was entrawarded to his grandfather. Adnan died without progeny in 449 Hijri Calendar, and consequently the physical line of al-Radi came to an end.

See also
 Fakhrul Mulk
 Islamic scholars
 List of deceased Maraji

References

External links
hadith.net
For study: al-Radhi glimpses of his life and his contributions to cognitive

970 births
1015 deaths
10th-century Arabs
10th-century Muslim scholars of Islam
Al-Moussawi family
Iraqi Shia Muslims
Shia scholars of Islam
Writers from Baghdad